We, the Animals Squeak! is a 1941 Warner Bros. Looney Tunes cartoon short directing Bob Clampett. The short was released on August 9, 1941, and stars Porky Pig. The voices were performed by Mel Blanc, Sara Berner, Billy Bletcher and Phil Kramer.

This short is a parody of the 1930s radio program, "We the People," an early reality program where people would share unusual stories with the audience. Porky Pig is the program's moderator.

Plot
The cartoon begins with the radio program, "We, the Animals Squeak!" in progress, and a hare finishing his story about how he got revenge on a hunter that had been stalking him. Porky Pig, the program's host, introduces the Irish-accented Kansas City Kitty, a champion mouse catcher.

Kansas City Kitty tells her life's story, including her marriage to Tom Collins and the birth of her son, Little Patrick. The main thrust of her story is how her reputation as a mouse catcher was nearly ruined by the mice, who – tired of being harassed by Kansas City Kitty and being kept away from the food – plot their revenge. In the catacombs of the house's walls, the lead mouse (Ratt McNalley) plots a scheme to kidnap Little Patrick while his mother is asleep. The mice carry out the plan and successfully flee the angry Kitty. The mother cat desperately claws at the wall, but Ratt stands up to her and threatens to brutally kill Little Patrick if their demands are not met.

Those demands – allowing free rein of the house – are played out in the next scene. A series of spot gags follow, where the mice carry food from the refrigerator, get drunk on milk and generally harass Kitty. Meanwhile, one of Ratt's henchmen decides to tease Little Patrick, but Patrick proves to be very resourceful and quickly turns the tables on his captor. Patrick escapes and reunites with his mother; Ratt, who is taunting Kitty, quickly knows what this means and tries to flee, but Kitty quickly catches all the mice and "shows those little devils they couldn't harm kit nor kin (a play on words of "kith nor kin") of Kansas City Kitty!"

The story brings loud cheers from the audience, and an impressed Porky gives her a present: a wimpy little mouse that scares her. "Well, faith'n me jabbers," intones the mouse, just as the Irish-shaped iris out ends the cartoon.

References

Succession

External links
 
 We, the Animals Squeak! (Colorized) on the Internet Archive

1941 films
Looney Tunes shorts
Films directed by Bob Clampett
1940s American animated films
Films scored by Carl Stalling
1941 animated films